Kim Jong-man (born 1961 or 1962) is a North Korean former footballer. He represented North Korea at the 1980 AFC Asian Cup, 1982 Asian Games and the 1986 Merlion Cup.

Career statistics

International

International goals
Scores and results list North Korea's goal tally first, score column indicates score after each North Korea goal.

Notes

References

Date of birth unknown
Living people
North Korean footballers
North Korea international footballers
Association football midfielders
Amnokgang Sports Club players
1980 AFC Asian Cup players
Footballers at the 1982 Asian Games
Footballers at the 1990 Asian Games
Medalists at the 1990 Asian Games
Asian Games medalists in football
Asian Games silver medalists for North Korea
Asian Games competitors for North Korea
Year of birth missing (living people)